Kaj Ikast (22 December 1935 – 3 December 2020) was a Danish politician.

He served in the Folketing and was the minister of transport from 1990 to 1993.

References

1935 births
2020 deaths
Transport ministers of Denmark